Nuclear Time  is a BBC Books original novel written by Oli Smith and based on the long-running British science fiction television series Doctor Who. It features the Eleventh Doctor along with Amy Pond and Rory Williams.

Synopsis
In Colorado in 1981, The Doctor, Amy and Rory arrive in Appletown, an idyllic village in the middle of the American desert where the townsfolk go peacefully about their routines. However, all is not as it seems. The village is populated by murdering robots who will kill the moment their cover is blown: 5 minutes in the Doctor's case. While Amy and Rory run and hide in the town, the Doctor is trapped, going backwards in time and getting ever further away.

The awful truth dawns on him: Appletown is a dummy, a prefabricated town awaiting destruction by a Nuclear bomb, designed to kill the robots. Can the Doctor get himself, Amy and Rory out while he is going backwards in time and the TARDIS is stuck at ground zero.

See also

Whoniverse

References

External links

2010 British novels
2010 science fiction novels
New Series Adventures
Eleventh Doctor novels
Novels set in Colorado
Fiction set in 1981